Suttontown (originally Sutton Town) is a north-western suburb of Mount Gambier, a city in the south-east of South Australia.

Boundaries for the suburb were created in February 1999 for the “long established name.”  It was originally a private subdivision of sections 259 and 265 of the Hundred of Blanche, which were adjacent to the Wandilo and Wireless W roads level crossing of the Kalangadoo railway line.

The dwelling known as ‘Pine Hall’ is listed as a state heritage place on the South Australian Heritage Register.

The 2016 Australian census which was conducted in August 2016 reports that Suttontown had a population of 583 people.

Suttontown is located within the federal division of Barker, the state Electoral district of Mount Gambier and the local government areas of the District Council of Grant and the City of Mount Gambier.

References

Limestone Coast